Rong Xinjiang (born 1960) is a Chinese historian who is a professor at Peking University, currently serving as chairperson of Academic Committee of Department of History and chairperson of Center for Research on Ancient Chinese History. He is also the Cheung Kong Scholars Distinguished Professor of the Ministry of Education, vice chairperson of the Tang Dynasty Institute of China and the Dunhuang and Turpan Institute of China.

Biography 
Rong was born in Tianjin in 1960. In 1978, he was admitted to Peking University, where he majored in the Department of History. After graduating in 1985, he stayed at the university and taught there. He was promoted to associate professor in 1988 and to full professor in 1993. From September 1984 to July 1985, he studied at the Sinological Institute, Leiden University in the Netherlands.

He was a visiting scholar at Ryukoku University (September 1990–February 1991), the British Library (February 1991–August 1991), the Institute of Chinese Studies, Chinese University of Hong Kong (November 1992–May 1993), Kyoto University (October 1994–November 1994), Free University Berlin (June 1996–August 1996), the Council on East Asian Studies, Yale University (October 1996–January 1997), and the École Pratique des Hautes Études (1997).

Publications

Selected papers

Academic books

Honours and awards 
 22 July 2021 Corresponding Fellow of the British Academy

References

External links 
Biography of Rong Xinjiang on the official website of Peking University 

1960 births
Living people
People from Tianjin
Chinese historians
Peking University alumni
Academic staff of Peking University